Donald Moffat (26 December 1930 – 20 December 2018) was a British actor with a decades-long career in film and stage in the United States. He began his acting career on- and off-Broadway, which included appearances in The Wild Duck and Right You Are If You Think You Are, earning a Tony Award nomination for both, as well as Painting Churches, for which he received an Obie Award. Moffat also appeared in several feature films, including The Thing and The Right Stuff, along with his guest appearances in the television series Dr. Quinn, Medicine Woman and The West Wing.

Early life
Moffat was born in Plymouth, Devon, the only child of Kathleen Mary (née Smith) and Walter George Moffat, an insurance agent. His father was Scottish. His parents ran a boarding house in Totnes. Completing his studies at the local King Edward VI School and national service in the Army from 1949 to 1951, Moffat trained at the Royal Academy of Dramatic Art in London.

Career

Stage
Moffat began his career as a stage actor in London and New York City. His first work was at the Old Vic Theatre Company in London.

After moving to the United States, Moffat worked as a bartender and a lumberjack in Oregon, his wife's home state. "After six months," he said, "I realized that I was an actor and I would always be an actor. And an actor must act. So I started acting again." His first acting job in the United States was in Princeton, New Jersey. He worked as a carpenter, and his wife did ironing in order to supplement his $25 per week pay.

He joined APA (The Association of Producing Artists), a repertory company on Broadway, and was nominated for a Tony for Best Actor in a Play in 1967 for his roles in revivals of Henrik Ibsen's The Wild Duck and Pirandello's Right You Are If You Think You Are.

He was nominated for Drama Desk Awards for Outstanding Actor in a Play for his work in Play Memory (1984) and for Outstanding Featured Actor in the revival of Eugene O'Neill's The Iceman Cometh (1986) with Jason Robards. He won an Obie for Painting Churches. In 1998, he was nominated for a Gemini Award for his performance as attorney Joe Ruah in the CBC miniseries The Sleep Room. He also appeared in many Broadway and Off-Broadway plays, including John Guare's A Few Stout Individuals (as Ulysses S. Grant), The Heiress, The Cherry Orchard, Much Ado About Nothing, The School for Scandal, The Affair and Hamlet.

Film
Among Moffat's best-known film roles are as Lyndon B. Johnson in The Right Stuff (1983), the corrupt U.S. president in Clear and Present Danger, and as Garry, the station commander in The Thing.

Television
Moffat played Enos in the CBS western miniseries The Chisholms, Lars Lundstrom in the ABC drama The New Land. and Rem in the CBS science-fiction series Logan's Run. He also appeared in Columbo, The West Wing, Dr. Quinn, Medicine Woman and Tales of the City, in which his performance as dying executive Edgar Halcyon earned him many new fans. One of his final roles was as Baseball Commissioner Ford Frick in the HBO movie, 61*. Moffat's last role was as a judge in an episode of Law & Order: Trial by Jury in 2005.

Personal life
Moffat married actress Anne Murray in 1954; they had a daughter, Wendy, and a son, Gabriel, before divorcing in 1968. He later married actress Gwen Arner.

Moffat died on 20 December 2018 in Sleepy Hollow, New York due to complications from a stroke at the age of 87.

Selected TV and filmography

 The Battle of the River Plate (U.S. title Pursuit of the Graf Spee) (1956) as Swanston, Lookout,  (uncredited) 
 Rachel, Rachel (1968) as Niall Cameron
 R. P. M. (1970) as Perry Howard
 The High Chaparral (1970) as Henry Simmons
 Mission Impossible (1971) as Alex Pierson
 Night Gallery (1971) "Pickman's Model" as Uncle George 
 The Great Northfield Minnesota Raid (1972) as Manning
 Showdown (1973) as Art Williams
 Gunsmoke (1974) "The Foundling" (S19E18) as Joseph Graham
 The Terminal Man (1974) as Dr. Arthur McPherson
 Earthquake (1974) as Dr. Harvey Johnson
 The Call of the Wild (1976) as Simpson
 Ebony, Ivory & Jade (1976) as Ian Cabot 
 The Waltons (1977) as Mr. Morgan
 Family (1977) as Philip Raskin
 Exo-Man (1977) as Wallace Rogers
 Logan's Run (1977-1978) as Rem
 Little House on the Prairie (1978) as Mr Mears (2 episodes)
 Eleanor and Franklin: The White House Years (1977) as Harry Hopkins
 Land of No Return (1978) as Air Traffic Controller
 The Word (1978) as Henri Aubert
 Promises in the Dark (1979) as Dr. Walter McInerny
 On the Nickel (1980) as Sam
 Popeye (1980) as the Taxman
 The Chisholms CBS miniseries (1980) as Enos
 The Thing (1982) as M.T. Garry
 The Right Stuff (1983) as U.S. Vice President Lyndon B. Johnson
 License to Kill (1984) as Webster
 Alamo Bay (1985) as Wally
 The Best of Times (1986) as the Colonel
 Monster in the Closet (1986) as General Franklin D. Turnbull
 The Bourne Identity (1988) as David Abbott; in the 2002 film version the role is re-imagined as Deputy Director Ward Abbott (played by Brian Cox)
 The Unbearable Lightness of Being (1988) as Chief Surgeon
 Far North (1988) as Uncle Dane
 Music Box (1989) as Harry Talbot
 The Bonfire of the Vanities (1990) as Mr. McCoy
 Class Action (1991) as Quinn
 Regarding Henry (1991) as Charlie Cameron
 Babe Ruth (1991) as Jacob Ruppert
 Housesitter (1992) as George Davis
 Love, Cheat & Steal (1993) as Frank Harrington
 Clear and Present Danger (1994) as the fictional President Bennett
 Trapped in Paradise (1994) as Clifford Anderson
 The Evening Star (1996) as Hector Scott
 The Sleep Room (1998) as Joe Ruah 
 Cookie's Fortune (1999) as Jack Palmer
 61* (2001) as Ford Frick
 The West Wing (2003) as Talmidge "Tal" Cregg (C.J.'s Father)
 Law & Order: Trial by Jury (2005) as a Judge (final appearance)

References

Bibliography

External links
 
 
 

1930 births
2018 deaths
Alumni of RADA
English emigrants to the United States
English male film actors
English male stage actors
English male television actors
English people of Scottish descent
American people of Scottish descent
Male actors from Plymouth, Devon
People from Totnes